Hutt Intermediate School (HIS) is a state intermediate school located in Lower Hutt, New Zealand. The school was founded in 1948, and currently has a total number of 685 students and a teaching staff of 45.

The principal, until the end of 2006, was Neil Withington. He was the principal of Hutt Intermediate School for six years, and has left to take up a position at Victoria University of Wellington. Mike Gillatt has taken up the position since.

Houses
The four houses in the school (in alphabetical order) are Bracken (green), Brooke (blue), Burns (white) and Byron (red), named after British poets. The houses compete fiercely to win the House Cup, awarded at the end of every school year.

Every student and member of staff in the school, other than the principal and deputy principals, subscribe to one of these houses.

It is often the case that families will align themselves to certain houses, such as where the oldest sibling of a family was in Burns, their younger siblings, children and grandchildren who attend the school will also be in Burns. The School song is sung at every school assembly with all up standing.

Notable alumni
Chris Bishop (born 1983), politician
 Chris Hipkins, NZ Prime Minister, politician
Jason O'Halloran, rugby player
Anna Paquin, actress
Holly Walker  (born 1982), politician
Nick Willis, Olympic athlete

Notes

External links
 School website

Educational institutions established in 1948
Intermediate schools in New Zealand
Schools in Lower Hutt
1948 establishments in New Zealand